The Seborga national football team is the team that represents the Principality of Seborga. It is not a member of FIFA or UEFA, but is an associate member of the N.F.-Board, an organisation for teams who are not members of FIFA. They were admitted to the N.F.-Board as a provisional member in 2014.

Seborga Football Federation 

The Seborga Football Federation is the football association of Seborga. It was founded on June 6, 2014, in conjunction with the national football team.

History

Foundation
The team was then admitted to the N.F.-Board and the signing of the registration act to the federation took place in Seborga at the presence of the President of CONS Marcello Paris, the Crown Counselor for Sports Giuseppe Bernardi, the Crown Counselor for Foreign Affairs and Princess Consort Nina Menegatto and the Seborgan Representative for Alsace Marcel Mentil. The board of directors of the FCPS is composed by Claudio Gazzano, Matteo Bianchini, Marcel Mentil and Linda Chittolini.

The first international game of the Seborgan team was disputed on August 10, 2014, in Ospedaletti against Sealand. For the occasion most of the Seborga players were lent by the local team ASD Ospedaletti. The game ended 2-3 and Seborga lost.

Overall record

*Denotes draws include knockout matches decided on penalty kicks.

International results and upcoming fixtures

Coaches

Kit
Seborga's kit has the same colors as the flag of Seborga. The main uniform of Seborga has a blue shirt with a white cross, blue shorts and white socks. The technical sponsor is FOOTEX.

References

External links
 Official website

European national and official selection-teams not affiliated to FIFA
Seborga